Phymatolithon lenormandii is a common red alga.

Description
Phymatolithon lenormandii is a thin alga growing encrusting as a thin flat chalky thallus clearly without branches. In colour it is mauvish or pinkish like a thin painted surface forming a patchwork when meeting other incrusting algae.

Habitat
Common, epilithic on rock and shells in the literal and sublittoral to a depth of 30m, growing best in shady sites.

Reproduction
Monecious or dioecious with conceptacles, carpospogonia and tetrasporangial conceptacles forming raised chambers.

Distribution
Common around Ireland, Great Britain, Isle of Man and the Channel Isles. In Europe it is recorded from Norway to the Mediterranean. World-wide from Canada USA Mexico, Japan and southern America.

References

Corallinales